Parca may refer to:

 personified destiny in Roman mythology, see Parcae
 another name for Partula, a Roman goddess of childbirth; see List of Roman birth and childhood deities
 Parca (moth), a moth genus established by Saalmüller in 1891
 Parca (wasp), an ichneumon wasp genus junior invalidly established by B.D. Wragge-Morley in 1913, but not yet renamed
 PACS Administrators Registry and Certification Association, a professional society that provides certification services for medical image archive and electronic medical records administrators and support professionals
 Parca is also the Spanish translation for the Grim Reaper

See also
Parka (disambiguation)